Jonathan Mark Tisch (born December 7, 1953) is an American businessman. He is the CEO of American luxury hospitality company Loews Hotels.  Tisch is also a board member of the Tribeca Film Institute.

He is a co-owner, of the New York Giants. He served as co-chairman of the 2014 NY/NJ Super Bowl host committee.

Career
Tisch was named chairman of Loews Hotels (a wholly-owned subsidiary of Loews Corporation) in 1989.

Tisch initiated the Loews Hotels Good Neighbor Policy over 20 years ago, one of the first of its kind in the hospitality industry.

Tisch serves as Chairman Emeritus of the U.S. Travel Association, the national non-profit association representing all segments of the multibillion-dollar travel industry. For six years, he served as Chairman of NYC & Company, the city's official tourism marketing agency and convention and visitors bureau.

In the aftermath of September 11, Tisch served as Chairman of New York Rising, a task force set committed to reviving tourism in New York City. Crain's New York Business named Tisch one of the "Top Ten Most Influential Business Leaders" and he was named "CEO of the Year" by the Executive Council of New York in 2006.

He is a co-owner of the New York Football Giants. He also serves on the board of directors of the New York Giants and is the team's Treasurer. In 2010, Tisch joined Jets owner Woody Johnson as co-chairs of the bid committee established to bring Super Bowl XLVIII to the New York/New Jersey metropolitan area, which happened in 2014 when the Super Bowl was played at MetLife Stadium.

Books 
Tisch is the author of three books that explore his leadership philosophy, the role of the customer experience, and civic engagement: The Power of We: Succeeding Through Partnerships, Chocolates on the Pillow Aren't Enough: Reinventing the Customer Experience, and Citizen You: Doing Your Part to Change the World.

Media 
He is the host of Beyond the Boardroom with Jonathan Tisch, where he interviews American businesspeople. In 2008, Tisch co-founded Walnut Hill Media, LLC, a separate, privately held company investing in a variety of media opportunities. Through Walnut Hill Media, Tisch is a minority investor in Tribeca Enterprises.

Philanthropy

Tisch served as the Vice-Chairman of The Welfare to Work Partnership, and currently serves on the Board of Trustees for Tufts University. Tisch, who graduated from Tufts University in 1976, gave an endowed gift of $40 million to fund the Jonathan M. Tisch College of Citizenship and Public Service which celebrated its tenth anniversary in 2011. Tisch is on the board of the Tribeca Film Institute

In 2011, Lizzie and Jonathan Tisch made a $10 million gift to The Metropolitan Museum of Art to support an exhibition space within the Costume Institute to be named The Lizzie and Jonathan Tisch Gallery.

In March 2022, Tisch announced that he was making a contribution to his high school alma mater, The Frederick Gunn School, of $25 million to design and construct the Lizzie and Jonathan Tisch Center for Innovation and Active Citizenship.

Lizzie has sat on the Board of Trustees of NewYork–Presbyterian Hospital since 2015.

Tisch was elected chairman of the board of The Shed, a New York City arts center, in 2022.

Awards 
In June 2022, Tisch was recognized by the International Hospitality Institute on the Global 100 in Hospitality, a list featuring the 100 Most Powerful People in Global Hospitality.

Personal life
Tisch was born to a Jewish family, the son of Joan (née Hyman) and Preston Robert Tisch, who was co-owner of Loew's Hotels and of the New York Giants.

In 1988, he married Laura Steinberg, the daughter of financier and insurance executive Saul Steinberg, at the Central Synagogue in Manhattan. They divorced in 2000.

In 2007, he married Lizzie Stern Rudnick.

References

External links
Tufts University Trustee Profile
Loews Corporation Governance
Q & A with Jonathan Tisch - forbes.com
$40 Million Gift - Tufts University
Mother Jones Donor Profile - Jonathan Tisch
Beyond the Boardroom - TV Show hosted by Jonathan Tisch

Loews Names Virgin’s Whetsell Chief Executive of Hotel Division
Interview with The New York Resident Magazine

Living people
American chief executives of travel and tourism industry companies
American billionaires
The Frederick Gunn School alumni
Tufts University alumni
Jewish American sportspeople
Jewish American philanthropists
Jonathan Tisch
American philanthropists
1953 births